Faulquemont (Lorraine Franconian: Folkenburch) is a commune in the Moselle department in Grand Est in north-eastern France.

Localities of the commune: Bonhouse (German: Bohnhaus), Chémery (a.k.a. Chémery-lès-Faulquemont, incorporated in 1973, German: Schemmerich).

Population

See also
 Communes of the Moselle department

References

External links
 

Communes of Moselle (department)
Duchy of Lorraine